Tora is a 1988 music album by singer Anna Vissi. It was released in Greece and Cyprus by CBS Greece.

Background and release
The lead single 1988 Ki Akoma S' Agapo ("1988 and still loving you") was well received by radio stations, rising to the top of the charts. The song is considered a classic Greek ballad and a pop standard. After the promotion of other top 5 singles in the Greek and Cypriot media, the song Ta Mathitika Hronia ("The school years") was released. It became a hit and remains one of Vissi's most recognizable songs from the 1980s. Another hit from the album was Ta Koritsia Einai Atakta ("Girls are mischievous"). Later that year, Vissi started a popular radio program named after that song, which lasted until 1992.

The album itself was commercially and critically well received, with sales reaching Gold status, selling approximately 50,000 copies and becoming one of the most commercial Greek albums of 1988.

It was released on CD in early 1988, along with the LP and cassette releases, though in 1992, the original album along with Vissi's 1986 album I Epomeni Kinisi were released in a joint package, as their initial CD releases had been out of print at the time. The opening track "1988 Ki Akoma S' Agapo" was omitted from the track list. In 1996, the album was re-released on CD, the artwork and track list being kept as the original. 

In 2019, the album was selected for inclusion in the Panik Gold box set The Legendary Recordings 1982-2019. The release came after Panik's acquisition rights of Vissi's back catalogue from her previous record company Sony Music Greece. This box set was printed on a limited edition of 500 copies containing CD releases of all of her albums from 1982 to 2019 plus unreleased material.

Track listing
Music and lyrics are by Nikos Karvelas and Anna Vissi.
"1988 Ki Akoma S' Agapo" (1988 and I still love you)
"Mono To Sex De Ftani" (Only sex is not enough)
"Kypseli" (Kypseli)
"Ta Koritsia Einai Atakta" (Girls are naughty)
"Magiko Hali" (Magic carpet)
"Ta Mathitika Hronia" (The school years)
"Mono Mia Nihta" (Only one night)
"Tora" (Now)
"Den S' Allazo" (I don't change you)
"Skandali" (Trigger)

Credits and personnel
Credits adapted from the album's liner notes.

Personnel
Stelios Goulielmos - backing vocals
Nikos Antypas - drums 
Nikos Vardis - bass 
Aris Karantanis - saxophone
Yiannis Piliouris - backing vocals
Lia Piliouris - backing vocals
Katerina Adamantidou - backing vocals
Kostas Charitodiplomenos - keyboards, solo guitar, bass
Nikos Karvelas - music, lyrics, piano, synthesizers, guitars, percussions, backing vocals
Tony Kritikos - guitar
Anna Vissi - vocals, lyrics

Production
Nikos Karvelas - production management, arrangements, instrumentation, instrument playing
Akis Golfidis - recording engineering, mixing at Studio SIERRA
Manolis Olandezos - assistant recording engineer at Studio SIERRA

Design
Dinos Diamantopoulos - photos
Thanos Spiropoulos - cover design
AKMI - films
Michalis Orfanos - cover printing

References

Anna Vissi albums
1988 albums
Greek-language albums
Sony Music Greece albums
Albums produced by Nikos Karvelas